The 1940–41 Cypriot First Division was the 7th season of the Cypriot top-level football league.

Overview
It was contested by 5 teams, and AEL Limassol won the championship.

League standings

Results

Championship play-off
 APOEL F.C. v AEL Limassol 1-2
 AEL Limassol v APOEL F.C. 3-1

References
Cyprus - List of final tables (RSSSF)

Cypriot First Division seasons
Cypriot
1940–41 in Cypriot football